is a Japanese manga series written and illustrated by Motoyuki Ōta. It was serialized in Shogakukan's Monthly Ikki between 2009 and 2012. It was adapted into a Japanese television drama series in 2013.

Characters
 Nobue Iketani as Etsuko Takanashi
 Yoshikazu Ebisu
 Ayumu Katō
 Mikihisa Azuma
 Hiroki Konno
 Yōichi Nukumizu

Media

Manga
Takanashi-san is written and illustrated by Motoyuki Ōta. It was serialized in Shogakukan's Monthly Ikki from September 25, 2009, to July 25, 2012. Shogakukan published its chapters in three tankōbon volumes, released from May 28, 2010, to March 29, 2013.

References

Comedy anime and manga
Shogakukan manga
Seinen manga
NHK original programming
2013 Japanese television series debuts
Japanese comedy television series
Japanese television dramas based on manga
2013 Japanese television series endings